Wendy Tomlinson (born 19 September 1950) is a South African former professional tennis player.

Born in Johannesburg, Tomlinson began competing on tour in the late 1960s. She represented South Africa in the Federation Cup twice, playing doubles rubbers against Belgium in 1969 and the United States in 1970.

See also
List of South Africa Federation Cup team representatives

References

External links
 
 
 

1950 births
Living people
South African female tennis players
Tennis players from Johannesburg